Anjette Lyles (née Donovan; August 23, 1925 – December 4, 1977) was an American restaurateur and serial killer responsible for the poisoning deaths of four relatives in Macon, Georgia, between 1952 and 1958. Initially sentenced to death upon her conviction, Lyles was eventually diagnosed with paranoid schizophrenia and instead sent to the Central State Hospital in Milledgeville, where she spent the rest of her life.

Further reading
White, Jaclyn Weldon Whisper to the Black Candle : Voodoo, Murder, and the Case of Anjette Lyles Mercer University Press, US, 2013  https://www.mupress.org/Whisper-to-the-Black-Candle-Voodoo-Murder-and-the-Case-of-Anjette-Lyles-P44.aspx

Lyles v. The State, Supreme Court of Georgia, (1959) https://casetext.com/case/lyles-v-state-52

References

1925 births
1977 deaths
20th-century American criminals
American female serial killers
American people convicted of murder
American people who died in prison custody
American people with disabilities
Criminals from Georgia (U.S. state)
Filicides in Georgia (U.S. state)
Mariticides
Murderers for life insurance money
People convicted of murder by Georgia (U.S. state)
People from Macon, Georgia
Poisoners
People with schizophrenia
Prisoners who died in Georgia (U.S. state) detention